Tulir (also Romanized as Tūlīr and Towlīr) is a village in Ojarud-e Gharbi Rural District, in the Central District of Germi County, Ardabil Province, Iran. At the 2006 census, its population was 119, in 24 families.

References 

Tageo

Towns and villages in Germi County